Mr. Bones is a 2001 slapstick comedy film made and set in South Africa. Leon Schuster starred in the title role. He also created the story and co-wrote the screenplay. The film sets African "tradition" in opposition to forces of ambition and greed in contemporary South Africa, and plays on reversals of racial stereotypes for its humour.

The film grossed R33 million, making it the highest grossing South African film of all time, until it was beaten by its sequel, Mr Bones 2: Back from the Past (grossing R35 million), itself surpassed by Titanic in South Africa's box-office history.

Plot
The film begins in Kuvukiland, a kingdom somewhere in Southern Africa. Mr. Bones arrives as a baby, the sole survivor of an airplane crash that happens nearby. He grows older and becomes the bone-throwing prophesier for the kingdom. King Tsonga, ruler of Kuvukiland, longs for a male child to be heir to the throne. After having seventeen children, all of them girls, he gives up hope, until he remembers fathering a boy decades before in Sun City. He immediately sends Mr. Bones to find the future prince.

At the same time golf star Vince "The Prince" Lee, along with his coach, The Wild Boar, arrives in Sun City for a golf tournament. A local casino owner, Zach Devlin, places a huge bet on Vince Lee winning the tournament, but just before it begins, Wild Boar is injured in a freak accident when a passing plane drops a wild boar on him. He quickly recovers, but is held against his will in a local hospital. Without his coach, Vince Lee plays terribly, until he meets the eccentric Mr. Bones, who believes him to be the actual prince, and gives him a lucky streak. Vince nearly wins the game until Mr. Bones remembers his mission and stops a perfect putt. Vince retires in disgrace, but meets a local singer, Laleti, afterwards, whom he is stricken with. Mr. Bones notices this, and by impersonating her, he kidnaps Vince.

The next day, Wild Boar manages to escape from the hospital and goes on a search for Vince, along with Laleti and her mother. Enraged by Vince Lee's performance, and by the fact that everyone had gone missing, the casino owner mounts a search for them in a helicopter, along with two of his henchmen. After a series of comical mishaps, they all meet near Kuvukiland. Mr. Bones introduces Vince to King Tsonga, but after discovering that Vince is terrified of animals, King Tsonga disowns him, and prepares to die. The casino owner quickly locates Vince and Laleti, and attempts to kill them both, but Vince escapes. He finds Laleti tied to a tree with a lion about to eat her, and overcoming his fear, he chases the lion away. King Tsonga sees this, and decides that he doesn't want to die. Soon after, the casino owner reappears, but Mr. Bones, with the help of an elephant, causes the helicopter to crash. King Tsonga proclaims that Vince is his son, but asks Mr. Bones to throw his prophecy bones once more just to be sure. As Mr. Bones does this, Wild Boar arrives upon the scene, and it is confirmed that he is the actual prince.

The film closes with Mr. Bones, King Tsonga, and Wild Boar watching from Kuvukiland as Vince Lee, now married to Laleti, wins the Masters golf tournament.

Credits

Writing credits (in alphabetical order)
 Gray Hofmeyr: screenplay 
 Greg Latter: screenplay 
 Leon Schuster: screenplay 
 Leon Schuster: story

Cast (in credits order)
 Leon Schuster as Mr. Bones 
 David Ramsey as Vince Lee 
 Aldrovandra Cotton as Trader Viking
 Faizon Love as Pudbedder 
 Robert Whitehead as Zach Devlin 
 Jane Benney as Laleti

Remainder of cast (alphabetically listed)
 Fem Belling as the Helicopter Pilot 
 Fats Bookholane as King Tsonga  
 Zack Du Plessis as the Farmer 
 Ipeleng Matlhaku as Lindiwe
 Jerry Mofokeng as the Sangoma
 Craig Morris as the  Future Son-in-Law 
 Seputla Sebogodi as the Young King Tsonga 
 Alfred Ntombela as unnamed Kuvuki youngster
 Muso Sefatsa as Boy Tsonga 
 Keketso Semoko as Laleti's Mother 
 Ryan Joel Govender as Bones' Son
 Adam Woolf as Young Bones

References

External links
 
 

2001 comedy films
2001 films
South African comedy films
English-language South African films
2000s English-language films